Magomedkhan (Russian: Магомедхан) is a Russian Dagestani masculine given name that may refer to
Magomedkhan Aratsilov (born 1951), Russian freestyle wrestler 
Volk Han (Magomedkhan Gamzatkhanov, born 1961), Dagestani-born Russian professional wrestler and later a mixed martial artist